Ben Webb, known by the stage name Jinnwoo, is a Brighton-based musician, artist and writer.

Music career
After gigging pubs and clubs for numerous years, Jinnwoo independently released his debut EP Your Baby in 2014, as well as featuring on Kyla La Grange's second studio album Cut Your Teeth. This led to him being listed as one of The Independent'''s "10 faces to watch for 2015".

He released his first full-length album, Strangers Bring Me No Light, in 2016. The album featured guest appearances from the Kyla La Grange, Georgia Ruth, Alasdair Roberts, Malcolm Middleton, Rachael Dadd, Kamila Thompson, Noah Georgeson, The Earlies, and Hannah Peel. The album received critical acclaim from The Independent and Songwriting magazine.

In July 2016 he performed at the Cambridge Folk Festival. Later that year, he released a live EP, Ozzy Wood. Roisin O'Connor, reviewing it for The Independent, described the recording as "exquisite". He also announced he was working with a new folk collective called Bird in the Belly. They released their debut album The Crowing in March 2018. It was album of week in the Daily Express, who also labelled it "Folk album of the year".

In July 2019 his band Green Ribbons (a collaboration with Frankie Armstrong, Alasdair Roberts and Burd Ellen) released an eponymous album consisting of a capella singing.

On the 23 April 2021, Jinnwoo announced the released of his new single "Milk", via :Charlie Andrew's label Square Leg Records. The single was track of the day on Folk Radio UK, and listed as one of the tracks of the week on God Is in the TV.

Art career
Jinnwoo's art and photography has appeared in a range of publications including The Guardian, fRoots, and Beijing Today, and he has produced album covers for artists including The Rails, Kami Thompson and Lisa Knapp.

 Writing 
Jinnwoo's debut book, Little Hollywood'', was published in January 2020. Novelist and critic Dennis Cooper described it as one of his favourite books of the year.

Discography

Solo albums

Solo EPs

Features and appearances

Albums with Bird in the Belly

Albums with Green Ribbons

Publications

Picture books

Novels

References

External links

Musicians from Brighton and Hove
21st-century British artists
English folk musicians
Living people
Date of birth missing (living people)
Year of birth missing (living people)